Alexander Sutherland may refer to:

 Alexander Sutherland (educator) (1852–1902), Scottish-Australian educator, writer and philosopher
 Alexander Sutherland (footballer) (born 1987), Scottish footballer
 Alexander Sutherland (politician) (1849–1884), lawyer and political figure in Manitoba